Lauje is a Celebic language of Sulawesi in Indonesia. Ampibabo, spoken in Ampibabo District, may be a separate language.

References

Tomini–Tolitoli languages
Languages of Sulawesi